José Antonio Guerra Oliva (born August 9, 1979 in Santiago de Cuba) is a male diver from Cuba. He represented his native country at four consecutive Summer Olympics, starting in 2000 (Sydney, Australia). Guerra won a gold and three silver medals at Pan American Games during his career. He also won 2 gold medals at Central American Games becoming the only Cuban male diver in history achieving this. The Cuban diver is the only diver in his country to win a gold medal at World University Games in 1999 Palma de Mallorca adding a silver and a bronze in Beijing in 2001. Being the only Cuban diver to lead the Diving World Ranking in the history, back in 2005. Winner of Forty (40) medals at the Diving Grand Prix and 130 medals total along his career (until April 2011) (98 in  international events and 32 in nationals), and is considered the best diver in Cuba of all time. His coach is Lino Socorro Aleman, from Matanzas, Cuba.

References
 sports-reference
 Beijing 2008 Profile

1979 births
Living people
Cuban male divers
Divers at the 2000 Summer Olympics
Divers at the 2004 Summer Olympics
Divers at the 2007 Pan American Games
Divers at the 2008 Summer Olympics
Divers at the 2011 Pan American Games
Divers at the 2012 Summer Olympics
Olympic divers of Cuba
World Aquatics Championships medalists in diving
Pan American Games gold medalists for Cuba
Pan American Games silver medalists for Cuba
Pan American Games medalists in diving
Universiade medalists in diving
Central American and Caribbean Games gold medalists for Cuba
Competitors at the 2006 Central American and Caribbean Games
Divers at the 1999 Pan American Games
Universiade gold medalists for Cuba
Central American and Caribbean Games medalists in diving
Medalists at the 1999 Summer Universiade
Medalists at the 2001 Summer Universiade
Medalists at the 1999 Pan American Games
Medalists at the 2011 Pan American Games
21st-century Cuban people